Su Chiao-hui (5 April 1976) is a Taiwanese politician and lawyer.

Early life
Su Chiao-hui was born in Taipei. She obtained her bachelor's degree in law from National Taiwan University. She then obtained her Master of Laws from the Boston University School of Law and the University of Pennsylvania Law School.

Legal career
Su Chiao-hui was a trial lawyer who did pro bono work for people in poverty. While working for Formosa Transnational Attorneys at Law, a firm founded by Fan Kuang-chun and John Chen, Su was mentored by Wellington Koo. She has also served as executive director of her father's  starting in 2012.

Political career
Su defeated Ou Chin-shih and Liao Yi-kun in a Democratic Progressive Party primary held in March 2015 to win her party's nomination for the fifth constituency of New Taipei City. She defeated Kuomintang incumbent Huang Chih-hsiung, who had held the seat for three terms.

Personal life
Su is the eldest daughter of Su Tseng-chang and Chan Hsiu-ling. Su's husband, Lungnan Isak Fangas, is an Amis filmmaker.

References

1976 births
Living people
Democratic Progressive Party Members of the Legislative Yuan
New Taipei Members of the Legislative Yuan
Taiwanese women lawyers
Taiwanese people of Hoklo descent
Members of the 9th Legislative Yuan
University of Pennsylvania Law School alumni
Members of the 10th Legislative Yuan